Players and pairs who neither have high enough rankings nor receive wild cards may participate in a qualifying tournament held one week before the annual Wimbledon Tennis Championships.

Seeds

  Akiko Kijimuta (second round)
  Tammy Whittington (qualifying competition, lucky loser)
  Peanut Harper (first round)
  Rika Hiraki (qualified)
  Elizabeth Smylie (second round)
  Yone Kamio (second round)
  Louise Field (qualified)
  Cristina Tessi (qualified)
  Jo-Anne Faull (qualifying competition, lucky loser)
  Els Callens (second round)
  Angélica Gavaldón (first round)
  Erika deLone (first round)
  Michelle Jaggard-Lai (first round)
  Karin Kschwendt (qualified)
  Maria Strandlund (qualifying competition)
  Ann Devries (qualified)

Qualifiers

  Miriam Oremans
  Jennifer Santrock
  Rika Hiraki
  Cristina Tessi
  Louise Field
  Ann Devries
  Claire Wegink
  Karin Kschwendt

Lucky losers

  Jo-Anne Faull
  Tammy Whittington

Qualifying draw

First qualifier

Second qualifier

Third qualifier

Fourth qualifier

Fifth qualifier

Sixth qualifier

Seventh qualifier

Eighth qualifier

External links

1992 Wimbledon Championships on WTAtennis.com
1992 Wimbledon Championships – Women's draws and results at the International Tennis Federation

Women's Singles Qualifying
Wimbledon Championship by year – Women's singles qualifying
Wimbledon Championships